Cytoplasmic tyrosine-protein kinase BMX is an enzyme that in humans is encoded by the BMX gene.

Function 

Tyrosine kinases are either receptor molecules, which contain transmembrane and extracellular domains, or nonreceptor proteins, which are located intracellularly. One family of nonreceptor TKs includes the genes TEC, TXK, ITK, and BTK. All of these proteins are homologs of the Drosophila Src28 TK and contain an SH3 and SH2 domain upstream of the TK domain.

Interactions
BMX has been shown to interact with:
 PAK1, 
 PTK2, 
 PTPN21  and
 RUFY1.

References

Further reading

External links
 

Tyrosine kinases